Kiff is an American animated musical comedy television series created by Lucy Heavens and Nic Smal and produced by Disney Television Animation in association with Titmouse, Inc. The series premiered on March 10, 2023 on Disney Channel.

Synopsis
Set in Table Town, a mountainous place co-habitated by magical creatures and animals, the series centers around the adventures of Kiff, a young optimistic squirrel whose best intentions often lead to complete chaos, and her best friend Barry, a sweet and mellow bunny as they take the town by storm with their endless adventures and zest for life.

Characters

Main
 Kiff Chatterley (voiced by Kimiko Glenn) - a young optimistic squirrel who is the protagonist of the series.
 Barry Buns (voiced by H. Michael Croner) - a sweet and mellow rabbit who is Kiff's best friend and sidekick.

Recurring
 Martin Chatterley (voiced by James Monroe Iglehart) - Kiff's father, who loves orange juice.
 Beryl Chatterley (voiced by Lauren Ash) - Kiff's mother.
 Mary Buns (voiced by Rachel House) - Barry's mother.
 Terri Buns (voiced by Nichole Sakura) - Barry's sister and a social media influencer.
 Harry Buns (voiced by Josh Johnson) - Barry's brother, who wants to be a DJ.
 Kristophe Buns - Barry's one-eared baby brother.
 Principal Secretary (voiced by Nic Smal) - a secretary bird who is the principal at Kiff and Barry's school.
 Helen (voiced by Lucy Heavens) - a witch who is Kiff and Barry's drama teacher.
 Miss Deer Teacher (voiced by Deedee Magno Hall) - a deer who is Kiff and Barry's teacher.
 Pawva (voiced by Katie Crown) - the town's barista.
 Trollie (voiced by Rhys Darby) - a troll who lives under the town's bridge.
 Candle Fox (voiced by Vella Lovell) - a popular student in Kiff and Barry's class and Roy's daughter.
 Roy Fox (voiced by Eric Bauza) - a TV producer and Candle's father.
 Gareth, Darryn, and Trevor (all voiced by Tom Kenny) - Kiff and Barry's classmates.
 Reggie (voiced by Eric Bauza) - a raccoon in Kiff's class.

Guests
 Miss Moufflé (voiced by Aparna Nancherla) - A giraffe-librarian who runs the local library in Table Town.

Episodes

Production

Development
On June 17, 2021, during the Annecy International Animation Film Festival, it was announced that Lucy Heavens and Nic Smal were developing an animated series titled Kiff. According to the duo, the series is inspired by their experiences growing up in Cape Town, while Heavens described it as a series "about a kid who lives with her parents and goes to school" whose comedy focuses on the world and characters featured. Senior vice-president for Disney Channel's animation Meredith Roberts said, "Lucy and Nic are a brilliant creative team who produced a fresh and funny series with vibrant visuals that help bring the friendship between a squirrel and a bunny to life in a unique way". The series is produced by Disney Television Animation and Titmouse, Inc., with Kent Osborne serving as co-producer and story editor, and Winnie Chaffee producing. It consists of 22-minute episodes, composed of two 11-minute segments.  Edward Mejia, a Disney executive, oversees the series.

Music
The series features one original musical number per episode.

Animation
In addition to co-producing, Titmouse, Inc. also provides the animation for the series.

Release
Kiff premiered simultaneously on Disney Channel and Disney XD on March 10, 2023, with the show's first 6 episodes releasing on Disney+ a day later. In June 2022, it was announced that the first season of the series would have 30 22-minute episodes.

Notes

References

External links
 
 

2020s American animated comedy television series
2020s American animated television series
2020s American musical comedy television series
2023 American television series debuts
American children's animated adventure television series
American children's animated comedy television series
American children's animated fantasy television series
American children's animated musical television series
Animated television series about children
Animated television series about squirrels
Disney Channel original programming
English-language television shows
Fictional squirrels
Television series by Disney Television Animation